Offer Mizrahi (born 3 March 1967 in Haifa) is an Israeli former professional association footballer who was part of the 1988–89 championship squad at Maccabi Haifa and the Israel national football team.

Biography

Early life
Mizrahi joined the Maccabi Haifa academy at age 6 as he grew up in Kiryat Eliezer.

Footnotes

References

External links
  Profile and short biography of Offer Mizrahi on Maccabi Haifa's official website

1967 births
Living people
Israeli Jews
Israeli footballers
Maccabi Haifa F.C. players
Israel international footballers
Maccabi Herzliya F.C. players
Footballers from Haifa
Israeli people of Iraqi-Jewish descent
Association football forwards